The Selinsgrove Bridge is a railroad bridge that carries Norfolk Southern lines across the Susquehanna River between Lower Augusta Township, Pennsylvania and Selinsgrove, Pennsylvania. The bridge once carried Pennsylvania Railroad and later Penn Central Railroad lines across the river. The bridge crosses over Cherry and Fishers Islands. Many of its wrought iron Pratt through truss spans date to 1888, with significant alterations in 1901, 1925 and 1930.

See also
List of bridges documented by the Historic American Engineering Record in Pennsylvania
List of crossings of the Susquehanna River
Selinsgrove, Pennsylvania

References

External links

Photos on Flickr

Bridges completed in 1888
Bridges in Northumberland County, Pennsylvania
Bridges in Snyder County, Pennsylvania
Bridges over the Susquehanna River
Norfolk Southern Railway bridges
Pennsylvania Railroad bridges
Railroad bridges in Pennsylvania
Historic American Engineering Record in Pennsylvania
Wrought iron bridges in the United States
Pratt truss bridges in the United States